Rhamnus arguta, the sharp-tooth buckthorn, is a plant which has become naturalized in Indiana, USA.

References

arguta
Plants described in 1866